The 904th Expeditionary Air Refueling Squadron is an inactive United States Air Force unit. It was last assigned to the 320th Bombardment Wing at Mather Air Force Base, California, where it was inactivated on 30 September 1986.

The squadron was first activated in January 1941 as the 14th Reconnaissance Squadron, which participated in anti-submarine warfare patrols after the Japanese attack on Pearl Harbor in the Gulf of Mexico before being redesignated the 404th Bombardment Squadron and moving to Alaska to participate in combat in the Aleutian Islands, where it earned a Distinguished Unit Citation.  After the war, the squadron remained in Alaska until it was inactivated in 1947.

The 904th Air Refueling Squadron was activated at Mather in 1959 and provided air refueling support for its wing's Boeing B-52 Stratofortresses and other USAF aircraft until it was inactivated in 1989.  In 1985 the two squadrons were consolidated into a single unit.

In 2002, the consolidated squadron was converted to provisional status as the 904th Expeditionary Air Refueling Squadron and assigned to Air Mobility Command.  There have been no known deployments of the squadron as an expeditionary unit.

History

World War II

The squadron was first activated in January 1941 as the 14th Reconnaissance Squadron (Heavy) in the Southeast Air District at Miami Municipal Airport and attached to the 44th Bombardment Group.  The squadron was equipped with Consolidated B-24 Liberators.  In June the squadron moved to MacDill Field, Florida, where the 44th Group and its three assigned squadrons were located.  Following the Japanese attack on Pearl Harbor, the squadron began to participate in antisubmarine patrols.

In May 1942, the squadron was redesignated the 404th Bombardment Squadron and assigned to the 44th Group.  As the rest of the 44th Group, which had been acting as an Operational Training Unit began intensive training for deployment to the European Theater of Operations, the squadron was detached from the 44th and sent to reinforce the 28th Composite Group in Alaska in July 1942.

The squadron's 1942 move to Alaska in July 1942 was in response to the Japanese invasion of the Aleutian Islands.  It flew long-range bombardment missions of enemy targets in the Aleutians during 1942 and 1943. The following year it attacked the Kuril Islands, for which it was awarded the Distinguished Unit Citation. The squadron remained in Alaska after Japanese forces were driven from the Aleutians. In late 1944, Eleventh Air Force modified two B-24D aircraft for ferret missions.  These aircraft were assigned to the 404th, although mission tasking was performed directly by the Eleventh Air Force Signal Office.  Ferret missions began in January 1945, and one of these aircraft was lost on a mission on 1 May 1945. The squadron continued to fly long-range reconnaissance operations from Shemya Army Air Base until it was inactivated in 1947.

Cold War
The 904th Air Refueling Squadron, Heavy was activated on 1 March 1959 by Strategic Air Command (SAC) at Mather Air Force Base, California, as the air refueling component of the 4134th Strategic Wing.  Operating Boeing KC-135 Stratotankers, it provided air refueling support to the B-52 Stratofortress strategic bombers of its parent wing and other USAF units as directed.  The squadron transferred to the 320th Bombardment Wing in 1963 when SAC replaced its Major Command controlled (MAJCON) strategic wings with Air Force controlled (AFCON) bombardment wings that inherited the honors earned by World War II bombardment groups.

The 904th deployed to the western Pacific region to support combat operations of deployed SAC units and tactical aircraft over Southeast Asia during the Vietnam War between 1966 and 1969. The squadron earned two Air Force Outstanding Unit Awards during the 1960s. In 1985, the 904th and the 404th Bombardment Squadron were consolidated when the United States Air Force combined inactive units that had served in World War II with squadrons that had been established after the war ended. The squadron was inactivated with its parent wing in 1989 when the B-52G was retired. Its equipment and personnel were reassigned to other units.

In 2002, the squadron was converted to provisional status and assigned to Air Mobility Command as the 904th Expeditionary Air Refueling Squadron.

Lineage
404th Bombardment Squadron
 Constituted as the 14th Reconnaissance Squadron (Heavy) on 20 November 1940
 Activated on 15 January 1941
 Redesignated 404th Bombardment Squadron (Heavy) on 22 April 1942
 Redesignated 404th Bombardment Squadron, Heavy in 1944
 Inactivated on 5 January 1947
 Consolidated with the 904th Air Refueling Squadron as the 904th Air Refueling Squadron on 19 September 1985

904th Air Refueling Squadron
 Constituted as the 904th Air Refueling Squadron, Heavy on 9 February 1959
 Activated on 1 March 1959
 Consolidated with the 404th Bombardment Squadron on 19 September 1985
 Inactivated on 1 October 1989
 Redesignated 904th Expeditionary Air Refueling Squadron and converted to provisional status on 12 June 2002

Assignments
 Southeast Air District, 15 January 1941 (attached to 44th Bombardment Group)
 44th Bombardment Group, 25 February 1942 (air echelon attached to 28th Composite Group after c. 12 July 1942)
 28th Composite Group (later 28th Bombardment Group) c. 21 September 1942
 Eleventh Air Force (later Alaskan Air Command), 20 October 1945 – 5 January 1947
 4134th Strategic Wing, 1 March 1959
 320th Bombardment Wing, 1 February 1963 – 1 October 1989
 Air Mobility Command to activate or inactivate anytime after 12 June 2002

Stations

 Miami Municipal Airport, Florida, 15 January 1941
 MacDill Field, Florida, 11 June 1941
 Barksdale Field, Louisiana, 7 February 1942
 Operated from Ladd Field, Alaska Territory, beginning 12 July 1942
 Operated from Marks Army Airfield, Alaska Territory, beginning c. 18 Ju1y 1942
 Will Rogers Field, Oklahoma, 25 Ju1y 1942
 Operated from Fort Glenn Army Airfield, Alaska Territory, after 24 August 1942

 Fort Lewis, Washington, 30 August 1942 – 10 September 1942
 Operated from Adak Army Airfield, Alaska Territory, after 13 September 1942
 Elmendorf Field, Alaska Territory, 21 September 1942
 Adak Army Airfield, Alaska Territory, 22 March 1943
 Operated from Amchitka Army Airfield, Alaska Territory after 4 June 1943
 Shemya Army Air Base, Alaska Territory c. 26 February 1944 – 5 January 1947
 Mather Air Force Base, California, 1 March 1959 – 1 October 1986

Aircraft
 Consolidated B-24 Liberator, 1941–1947
 Boeing KC-135 Stratotanker, 1959–1986

Awards and campaigns

See also

 List of United States Air Force air refueling squadrons
 B-24 Liberator units of the United States Army Air Forces

References

Notes
 Explanatory notes

 Citations

Bibliography

  (web access limited to members)
 
 
 
 "Lineage and Honors History: 904th Expeditionary Air Refueling Squadron Current Through 7 Apr 2003", prepared by Carl E. Bailey, approved by Judy G. Endicott, USAF Historical Research Agency, Maxwell AFB, Alabama

Further reading
 

Air refueling squadrons of the United States Air Force